Chris Lee Chih-cheng (born November 11, 1981) is a Taiwanese actor and model.

In 2004, he acted in Singapore's first action crime thriller film re:solve directed by Randy Ang.

Filmography

Film

Television series

Web series

References

External links
 
 
 
 
 

1981 births
Living people
Taiwanese male television actors
Taiwanese male film actors
21st-century Taiwanese male actors